

List of porcelain manufacturers

China 

 Ding ware
Jingdezhen porcelain

Japan 

Hirado ware
Kakiemon
Mikasa & Company
Nabeshima ware
Narumi
Noritake

Europe 

Porcelain manufacturing companies in Europe

Austria 

Vienna Porcelain Manufactory, 1718–1864
Vienna Porcelain Manufactory Augarten, 1923–present

Croatia 
Inkerpor, (1953–present)

Czech Republic 
Haas & Czjzek, Horní Slavkov, (1792–2011)
Thun 1794, Klášterec nad Ohří, (1794–present)
Český porcelán a.s., Dubí, Eichwelder Porzellan und Ofenfabriken Bloch & Co. Böhmen, (1864–present)
Rudolf Kämpf, Nové Sedlo (Sokolov District), (1907–present)

Denmark 
Aluminia
Bing & Grøndahl
Denmark porcelain
P. Ipsens Enke
Kastrup Vaerk
Kronjyden
Porcelænshaven
Royal Copenhagen (1775–present)
GreenGate

Finland 
Arabia
 Kupittaan Savi
 Savitorppa
 Kultakeramiikka
 Kermansavi
 Pentik

France 

 Saint-Cloud porcelain, (1693–1766)
 Chantilly porcelain, (1730–1800)
 Vincennes porcelain, (1740–1756)
 Mennecy-Villeroy porcelain, (1745–1765)
 Sèvres porcelain, (1756–present)
 Revol porcelain, (1789–present)
 Limoges porcelain
 Haviland porcelain

Germany 

Current porcelain manufacturers in Germany

Hungary 

Hollóháza Porcelain Manufactory, (1777–present)
Herend Porcelain Manufacture, (1826–present)
Zsolnay Porcelain Manufacture, (1853–present)

India 

 Arta Broch Ceramics
 TCL Ceramics (Formerly Tata Ceramics Limited)

Italy 

Richard-Ginori 1735 Manifattura di Doccia, (1735–present)
Capodimonte porcelain, (1743–1759)
Naples porcelain, 1771–1806
Manifattura Italiana Porcellane Artistiche Fabris, (1922–1972)
Mangani SRL, Porcellane d'Arte (Florence)

Lithuania 

 Jiesia

Netherlands 

Haagsche Plateelbakkerij, Rozenburg
Loosdrechts Porselein
Weesp Porselein

Norway 

Egersund porcelain
Figgjo (1941–present)
Herrebøe porcelain
Porsgrund
Stavangerflint

Poland 

Polskie Fabryki Porcelany “Ćmielów” i "Chodzież" S.A.
Kristoff Porcelana
Lubiana S.A.

Portugal 

Vista Alegre
Sociedade Porcelanas de Alcobaça
Costa Verde (company), located in the district of Aveiro

Russia 

Imperial Porcelain Factory, Saint Petersburg (1744–present)
Verbilki Porcelain (1766–present), Verbilki near Taldom
Gzhel ceramics (1802–present), Gzhel
Dulevo Farfor (1832–present), Likino-Dulyovo
 Lomonosov

Spain 

Buen Retiro Royal Porcelain Factory (1760–1812)
Real Fábrica de Sargadelos (1808–Present, intermittently)
Porvasal

Switzerland 

Suisse Langenthal

Sweden 

Rörstrand
Gustavsberg porcelain

United Kingdom 

Aynsley China, (1775–present)
Belleek, (1884–present)
Bow porcelain factory, (1747–1776)
Caughley porcelain
Chelsea porcelain factory, (c. 1745, merged with Derby in 1770)
Coalport porcelain
Davenport
Goss crested china
Liverpool porcelain
Longton Hall porcelain
Lowestoft Porcelain Factory
Mintons Ltd, (1793–1968, merged with Royal Doulton)
Nantgarw Pottery
New Hall porcelain
Plymouth Porcelain
Rockingham Pottery
Royal Crown Derby, (1750/57–present)
Royal Doulton, (1815–2009 acquired by Fiskars)
Royal Worcester, (1751–2008 acquired by Portmeirion Pottery)
Spode, (1767–2008 acquired by Portmeirion Pottery)
Saint James's Factory (or "Girl-in-a-Swing", 1750s)
Swansea porcelain
Vauxhall porcelain
Wedgwood, (factory 1759–present, porcelain 1812–1829, and modern. Acquired by Fiskars)

Brazil 

Germer Porcelanas Finas

Iran 

Maghsoud Factories Group, (1993–present)
Zarin Iran porcelain Industries, (1881–present)

Taiwan 

Franz Collection

Malaysia 

Royal Selangor

South Korea 

Haengnam Chinaware
Hankook Chinaware

Sri Lanka 

 Dankotuwa Porcelain
 Noritake Lanka Porcelain
 Royal Fernwood Porcelain

Turkey 

Yildiz Porselen (1890– 1936 / 1994–present)
Kütahya Porselen (1970–present)
Güral Porselen (1989–present)
Porland Porselen (1976–present)
Istanbul Porselen (1963– early 1990s)
Sümerbank Porselen (1957–1994)

United Arab Emirates 

 RAK Porcelain

United States 

Blue Ridge
Franciscan
Lenox
Lotus Ware
Pickard China

Vietnam 

Minh Long I porcelain, (1970–present)

References

 Porcelain